Obren (Cyrillic script: Обрен) is a Serbian masculine given name. It may refer to:

Obren Joksimović (born 1954), politician
Obren Petrović, politician
Obren Pjevović (1919–1991), songwriter and composer
Obren Ćorović (born 1983) carpenter

See also
Obrenović dynasty
Obrenovac
Obrenovac (Pirot)

Slavic masculine given names
Serbian masculine given names